East Carleton is a village and civil parish in the English county of Norfolk.

History
East Carleton's name is of Anglo-Saxon and Viking origin and derives from an amalgamation of the Old English and Old Norse for the settlement or farmstead of the freemen.

In the Domesday Book, East Carleton is listed as a settlement of 58 households in the hundred of Humbleyard. In 1086, the village was divided between the estates of Roger Bigod, Ralph de Beaufour and Ranulf de Peverel.

The village has good examples of surviving Sixteenth, Seventeenth and Nineteenth Century residential architecture.

Geography
According to the 2011 Census, East Carleton has a population of 343 residents living in 128 households.

East Carleton falls within the constituency of South Norfolk and is represented at Parliament by Richard Bacon MP of the Conservative Party. For the purposes of local government, the parish falls within the district of South Norfolk.

St. Mary's Church
East Carleton's parish church is dedicated to Saint Mary and is a Nineteenth Century rebuilding of a Medieval church on the same site. St. Mary's features examples of Nineteenth and Twentieth Century stained glass including an Angel of Charity installed by James Powell and Sons and a depiction of Saint Mary and Christ by Heaton, Butler and Bayne.

References

External links

South Norfolk
Villages in Norfolk
Civil parishes in Norfolk